Terence Evans (born 8 January 1976) is a Welsh former professional footballer who played as a defender.

Career
Evans began his career as a youth team member at Cardiff City. After completing a two-year YTS scheme, he made his professional debut in a 2–1 defeat to Bristol Rovers in January 1994 and made a handful of appearances during the season, including earning under 21 caps for Wales. He switched to the Welsh Premier League to play for Barry Town and was part of the side that found some success in European football.

In 2001, he returned to The Football League with Swansea City where, after beginning the season on the bench, he established himself in the first team, making 16 appearances in all competitions, before his season was ended in February 2002 when he suffered a double fracture in his jaw after being struck by a deliberate elbow thrown by David Partridge during a match against Leyton Orient on 9 February 2002. Evans was released by Swansea at the end of the 2002–03 season, moving to non-league club Newport County. After one season at Newport he was released by then manager Peter Nicolas in June 2005. He then had a brief spell playing for Cardiff Grange Quins, but re-joined Newport County in 2005.

He joined Welsh Premier League side Haverfordwest County in 2007, making over 100 appearances for the club before retiring on medical advice in 2011. He later played for Cambrian & Clydach Vale.

References

External links

Welsh Premier profile

1976 births
Living people
Footballers from Pontypridd
Welsh footballers
Cardiff City F.C. players
Barry Town United F.C. players
Swansea City A.F.C. players
Newport County A.F.C. players
Carmarthen Town A.F.C. players
Haverfordwest County A.F.C. players
Cambrian & Clydach Vale B. & G.C. players
Wales under-21 international footballers
Cymru Premier players
English Football League players
Association football defenders